Alexandre Nardy Rocha (born 21 November 1977) is a Brazilian professional golfer.

Rocha was born in São Paulo. He had a successful collegiate career in the United States, where he attended Mississippi State University, before turning professional in 2000. He won tournaments in South America and Canada before qualifying for the European Tour at the end of 2005. He did not win enough money during his rookie season to retain his playing status and returned to qualifying school where he was the joint winner alongside Carlos Rodiles.

Having lost his card on the European Tour again at the end of the 2009 season, Rocha qualified for the Asian Tour for 2010. In 2010, Rocha became the second Brazilian (after Jaime Gonzalez, who played on the PGA Tour up until 1982) to join the PGA Tour when he graduated from Qualifying School. Rocha finished 127th in the 2011 FedEx Cup standings, then lost his PGA Tour card after 2012. He played on the Web.com Tour in 2013 and 2014 before spending 2015 on PGA Tour Latinoamérica.

Amateur wins
1992 South American Championship
1993 Brazil National Junior Championship
1994 Brazil National Championship
1995 Brazil National Junior Championship, South American Championship
1997 Brazil National Championship

Professional wins (12)

PGA Tour Latinoamérica wins (2)

Tour de las Américas wins (1)
2001 Rabobank Masters de Chile

Canadian Tour wins (1)
2003 Casino de Charlevoix Cup (with Bryn Parry)

Gira de Golf Profesional Mexicana wins (1)

Other wins (7)
2000 San Fernando Open (Brazil)
2002 Sofitel Rio de Janeiro Pro-am (Brazil)
2003 Brasília DF Open (Brazil), Club de Campo Open (Brazil), Curitiba Open (Brazil)
2004 Little Rock Maverick Tour Classic (United States)
2008 Marbella Open (Chile)

Playoff record
Challenge Tour playoff record (0–1)

Results in major championships

CUT = missed the half-way cut
"T" = tied

Team appearances
Amateur
 Eisenhower Trophy (representing Brazil): 1994, 1996, 1998

Professional
 World Cup (representing Brazil): 2013

See also
2005 European Tour Qualifying School graduates
2006 European Tour Qualifying School graduates
2008 Challenge Tour graduates
2010 PGA Tour Qualifying School graduates
2011 PGA Tour Qualifying School graduates

References

External links

Brazilian male golfers
Mississippi State Bulldogs golfers
European Tour golfers
Asian Tour golfers
PGA Tour golfers
PGA Tour Latinoamérica golfers
Golfers at the 2019 Pan American Games
Pan American Games competitors for Brazil
Sportspeople from São Paulo
1977 births
Living people